The Eagle Mountain-Saginaw Independent School District is located in the northwest corner of Tarrant County, Texas (United States) and includes  of land in Saginaw, Eagle Mountain, Blue Mound and several housing additions in the City of Fort Worth, near Eagle Mountain Lake. Serving more than 18,000 students (a 17% increase over last year), the district consists of 15 elementary schools, six middle schools, three high schools, an alternative discipline center, Hollenstein Career and Technology Center, and the Weldon Hafley Development Center.

All campuses in the district are accredited by the Southern Association of Colleges and Schools and the Texas Education Agency. From kindergarten to high school, diverse special programs are available to support the regular curriculum and to provide for special needs. The district also offers an alternative education to at-risk students through Watson High School/ Alternative Discipline Center.

In 2018, the school district received a "B" performance average by the Texas Education Agency.

Schools

Specialty Campuses 

 Watson High School
 Sarah Hollenstein Career and Technology Center
 Alternative Discipline Center
 Hafley Development Center

High Schools (Grades 9-12)
Boswell High School (Fort Worth) (Pioneers)
Chisholm Trail High School  (Fort Worth) (Rangers)
Eagle Mountain High School (Fort Worth) (slated to open Fall 2024)
Saginaw High School (Saginaw) (Rough Riders)
Watson High School  (Forth Worth) (Warriors)

Middle Schools (Grades 6-8)
Creekview Middle School (Fort Worth) (Colts)
Ed Willkie Middle School (Fort Worth) (Badgers)
Highland Middle School (Saginaw) (Hawks)
Marine Creek Middle School (Fort Worth) (Mustangs)
Prairie Vista Middle School (Fort Worth) (Coyotes)
Wayside Middle School (Saginaw) (Wildcats)

Elementary Schools (Grades K-5)
Bryson Elementary School (Fort Worth) (Bobcats)
Chisholm Ridge Elementary School (Fort Worth) (Wranglers)
Comanche Springs Elementary School (Fort Worth) (Spurs)
Copper Creek Elementary School (Fort Worth) (Cowboys) 
Dozier Elementary School (Fort Worth) (Ducks)
Eagle Mountain Elementary School (Eagle Mountain) (Eagles)
Elkins Elementary School (Fort Worth) (Elks)
Gililland Elementary School (Blue Mound) (Eagles)
Greenfield Elementary School (Fort Worth) (Gators)
High Country Elementary School (Saginaw) (Cougars)
Lake Country Elementary School (Fort Worth) (Lions)
Lake Point Elementary School (Fort Worth) (Owls)
Remington Point Elementary School (Fort Worth) (Panthers)
Saginaw Elementary School (Saginaw) (Stars)
Northbrook Elementary School (Fort Worth) (Blazers)
Parkview Elementary School (Fort Worth) (Mavericks)
Willow Creek Elementary School (Saginaw) (Wolverines)

Demographics 

From circa 1997 and 2015 the number of non-Hispanic white children increased by 4,000 as part of a trend of white flight and suburbanization by non-Hispanic white families.

References

External links
Eagle Mountain-Saginaw Independent School District

School districts in Tarrant County, Texas
School districts in Fort Worth, Texas